Mount Grosvenor is an  mountain summit located in the Alaska Range, in Denali National Park and Preserve, in Alaska, United States. Its nearest higher peak is Mount Wake,  to the northwest. Despite its relatively low elevation, it is notable for its east face with over 4,000 feet of vertical sheer granite. The mountain was named by famed explorer Dr. Frederick Cook who claimed the first ascent of Mount McKinley in 1906, but was later disproved. This peak's unofficial name honors Gilbert Hovey Grosvenor (1875–1966), President of the National Geographic Society, father of photojournalism, and the first full-time editor of National Geographic magazine. The first ascent of the peak was made in 1979 by Gary Bocarde, Charlie Head, John Lee, and Jon Thomas.

Climate

Based on the Köppen climate classification,  Mount Grosvenor is located in a subarctic climate zone with long, cold, snowy winters, and cool summers. Temperatures can drop below −20 °C with wind chill factors below −30 °C. The months May through June offer the most favorable weather for climbing or viewing.

See also
Mountain peaks of Alaska

References

External links
 Mts. Grosvenor and Johnson: Flickr photo
 National Weather Service Forecast
 Mountain Forecast 

Alaska Range
Mountains of Matanuska-Susitna Borough, Alaska
Mountains of Denali National Park and Preserve
Mountains of Alaska
North American 2000 m summits